Fildes Strait is a strait which extends in a general east-west direction between King George Island and Nelson Island, in the South Shetland Islands. This strait has been known to sealers in the area since about 1822, but at that time it appeared on the charts as "Field's Strait". It was probably named for Robert Fildes, a British sealer of that period, whose vessel  was wrecked in Clothier Harbour in 1822.

Notes

References 
 Fildes Strait. SCAR Composite Antarctic Gazetteer

Bodies of water of King George Island (South Shetland Islands)
Straits of the South Shetland Islands